Augustus "August" Imgard (1828-1904) was a German immigrant who has been recognized as an early proponent in popularizing the Christmas tree in the United States. He has also been credited with being the first to decorate it with candy canes.

Biography
August Imgard emigrated from the Bavarian mountains of Germany to Wooster, Ohio before he was 20 years old and started a tailoring business.

In 1847, Imgard cut a blue spruce tree from a woods outside town, had the village tinsmith construct a star, and placed the tree in his house, decorating it with paper ornaments, gilded nuts and Kuchen. It stood on a slowly revolving platform while a music box played and people came from miles around to view it. Imgard died in 1904, is buried in the Wooster Cemetery, and every year, a large pine tree above his grave is lit with Christmas lights.

Although no longer credited as the first to introduce the Christmas tree to America, Imgard is still recognized as an early proponent. The National Confectioners Association also recognizes Imgard as the first to put candy canes on a Christmas tree; the canes were white, with no red stripes.

References

External links

1828 births
1904 deaths
German emigrants to the United States
People from Wooster, Ohio
Christmas traditions